Titusville is a city in and the county seat of Brevard County, Florida, United States. The city's population was 43,761 as of the 2010 United States Census.
Titusville is located along the Indian River, west of Merritt Island and the Kennedy Space Center, and south-southwest of the Canaveral National Seashore. It is a principal city of the Palm Bay–Melbourne–Titusville Metropolitan Statistical Area.

Near Titusville is the Windover Archeological Site, a National Historic Landmark recognizing its important collection of human remains and artifacts of the early Archaic Period (6,000 to 5,000 BCE.)

A secondary, de facto county seat was established beginning in 1989 at Viera, Florida, in the geographic center of the county, to better serve the more populous southern portion of the county.

History

Indigenous peoples had inhabited this area for thousands of years, as shown by discovery in 1982 of the Windover Archeological Site, dating to the early Archaic Period (6000 to 5000 BCE). It has been designated as a National Historic Landmark because of the significance of its remains.

At the time of European encounter, this area was inhabited by the Ais Indians, who gathered palmetto, cocoplum and seagrape berries. They also fished the Indian River, called the Rio de Ais by Spanish explorers. By 1760, however, the tribe had disappeared due largely to infectious disease, slave raids, and the disruptive effects of rum.

The United States acquired Florida from Spain in 1821, and the Seminole Wars delayed settlement of portions of the new territory.

This community was originally called Sand Point, and a post office was established in 1859, although it closed a few months later. Henry T. Titus arrived in 1867, intending to build a town on land owned by his wife, Mary Hopkins Titus, daughter of a prominent planter from Darien, Georgia. He laid out roads and in 1870 erected the Titus House, a large, one-story hotel next to a saloon. He also donated land for four churches and a courthouse, the latter an effort to get the town designated as county seat.

Local history says that Titus challenged Capt. Clark Rice to a game of dominoes to decide the name of the town. Titus won the game, and Sand Point was renamed as Titusville in 1873. The city was incorporated in 1887, the year construction began on St. Gabriel's Episcopal Church, as listed in the 1972 National Register of Historic Places. At one point, Titusville was nicknamed "The City of Churches".

The Atlantic Coast, St. Johns & Indian River Railroad reached Titusville in 1885, constructed from Enterprise, Florida. It was connected by a spur line to the Jacksonville, Tampa & Key West Railroad at Enterprise Junction in present-day DeBary, Florida. Henry Flagler extended his Florida East Coast Railroad south from Daytona, building a station at Titusville in 1892. Many tourists arrived by railroad to enjoy the mild winter climate.

In addition, the railroad was a means to ship area produce to northern markets, and the Indian River area increasingly became an agricultural and shipping center for pineapple and citrus goods. A wooden bridge was built east to Playalinda Beach in 1922.

In October 1918, Titusville officials were the first in the county to order closed all places of assembly, including schools, churches, and movies, to avoid spreading the Spanish flu.

Beginning in the late 1950s, the growth of Cape Canaveral, and later the Kennedy Space Center on Merritt Island, stimulated growth in the community's economy, population and tourism. The association with the space program led to the city's two nicknames in the 1960s: Space City USA and Miracle City. 

Searstown Mall opened in 1966. It had  of covered floor space.

The jail at the county courthouse became overcrowded by the 1980s. A new jailhouse was built in Sharpes in 1986. 

Computer Shopper was founded in Titusville in 1979 by Glenn Patch, first as a tabloid. It was later expanded as a magazine of over 800 pages per issue. It was published in Titusville until September 1989. That year operations were to be moved to New York City in a joint venture between Patch Communications of Titusville and Ziff Davis.

The A. Max Brewer Bridge, a  fixed high-level span on SR-406 connecting Titusville to Merritt Island National Wildlife Refuge and Canaveral National Seashore, opened on February 5, 2011, to replace the former swing bridge built in 1949. 

In May 2012, the Brevard County School Board closed Riverview Elementary School for budgetary reasons. It closed South Lake Elementary School on May 25, 2013.

In January 2013, Miracle City Mall closed, a victim of a declining local economy after the termination of the Space Shuttle program in 2012. In addition, county population had moved to the south, and changing shopping habits had adversely affected malls across the country.  Demolition of Miracle City Mall occurred February 2015. The site has been redeveloped as a mixed-use outdoor shopping complex called Titus Landing.

Because of population decline, the USPS had closed two post offices in Titusville by 2013, and discussed closing a third.

Newspapers
Titusville Star-Advocatebegan publication in 1920 when the East Coast Advocate and Indian River Chronicle merged with the Indian River Star; bought by Henry Hudson in 1925; became Brevard's first daily newspaper in 1965; the Star-Advocate was sold by Henry Hudson and his son Bob Hudson to Gannett Company in 1965.  As part of the deal, publication of the Star-Advocate would be retained as long as editor Bob Hudson wished.  Daily publication (Monday to Friday) ceased after January 31, 1975, when the Star-Advocate was changed to a weekly local insert for Titusville residents in Gannett's Florida Today starting Wednesday, February 5, 1975.  The format was changed from a newspaper to a small tabloid in the early 2000s.  In July 2013, publication of the Star-Advocate was ceased.
The North Brevard Beaconbiweekly newspaper based in Titusville that served the communities of North Brevard; publication started November 5, 2003; ceased publication after March 4, 2010.
The News Observer of North Brevardsemiweekly newspaper based in Titusville; ceased publication September 4, 2003 after 15 years.

Geography

Titusville is located at  (28.591210, –80.819911) in the northern half of Brevard County. Titusville is located on the Indian River Lagoon, part of the Atlantic Intracoastal Waterway.

Flora

The city is the only place in the world where the endangered Dicerandra thinicola, or "Titusville mint" grows. The fields are located along a  strip between the Titusville wellfield and Mims.

Climate

Titusville has a humid subtropical climate, with hot, humid summers and mild winters.

Demographics

As of the census of 2000, there were 40,670 people, 17,200 households, and 11,094 families residing in the city. The racial makeup of the city was 83.80 percent White, 12.64 percent African American, 0.39 percent Native American, 0.94 percent Asian, 0.04 percent Pacific Islander, 0.73 percent from other races, and 1.46 percent from two or more races. Hispanic or Latino of any race were 3.52 percent of the population.

There were 17,200 households, out of which 26.7 percent had children under the age of 18 living with them, 47.9 percent were married couples living together, 12.6 percent had a female householder with no husband present, and 35.5 percent were non-families. 29.9 percent of all households were made up of individuals, and 13.9 percent had someone living alone who was 65 years of age or older.  The average household size was 2.32 and the average family size was 2.86.

In the city, the population was spread out, with 22.9 percent under the age of 18, 6.9 percent from 18 to 24, 26.2 percent from 25 to 44, 23.2 percent from 45 to 64, and 20.8 percent who were 65 years of age or older.  The median age was 41 years. In 2010, this had risen to 43.4. For every 100 females, there were 90.8 males. For every 100 females age 18 and over, there were 87.1 males.

In 2010, for residents 25 and older, 89.3% had completed high school, 22.6% had at least a bachelor's degree.

In 2018,Titusville had an estimated population of 45,500 people with a median age of 46.2. The 5 largest racial groups in Titusville are White (Non-Hispanic) (76.7%), Black or African American (Non-Hispanic) (11.4%), White (Hispanic) (5.26%), Two+ (Non-Hispanic) (2.49%), and Asian (Non-Hispanic) (2.13%).

Government
Titusville is run by a council-manager government. The elected city council serves as the city's legislative branch, while the appointed city manager carries out policies defined by the council. The city is governed according to its Charter, adopted on June 3, 1963.

Titusville has the highest city tax rate in the county. In 2007, the city had a taxable real estate base of $2.34 billion.

The city has 1.8 police officers per thousand residents. This is 52% below average statewide for cities of its size.

A 2011 study rated the pension fund for city employees as mediocre or poor.

City council

Titusville's five city council members (one of whom is the mayor) are elected at-large to four-year, staggered terms. As the city's legislative body, the council determines all municipal policies not explicitly covered by the city charter or state legislation. It also adopts ordinances and resolutions, cote appropriations, approve budgets, determine the tax rate, and appoint citizens to serve on advisory boards and commissions.

The mayor presides over all city council meetings and votes as a council member. The mayor is the recognized head of city government for ceremonial and military law purposes, but has no regular administrative duties. The vice mayor is chosen from among the council members at their annual organizational meeting and takes the mayor's place during absence or disability.

Mayor: Daniel E. Diesel (Seat 4 – Term expires 2024)
Vice mayor: Jo Lynn Nelson (Seat 5 – Term expires 2022)
Council members:  Robert L. Jordan, Jr. (Seat 1 – Term expires 2022), Dr. Sarah Stoeckel (Seat 2 – Term expires 2024), Joe C. Robinson (Seat 3 – Term expires 2022)

City manager
The city manager is chosen by the city council on the basis of training, experience and ability, and serves at the pleasure of the council for an indefinite period of time. The city manager is tasked with enforcing all laws and ordinances, appointing and removing department heads and employees, supervising all departments, keeping the council advised on the city's financial situation, keeping the council and public informed of the city government's operations.

City manager: Scott Larese

County seat
The Brevard County Courthouse is located here. A new jail was built outside town to meet current standards. A full range of county services are provided at the county seat.

Economy
In 2010, private business was 24.7 percent "other"; 21.5 percent trade, transportation and utilities, 18.1 percent professional and business services; 13.7 percent educational and health services; 12 percent construction; and 10 percent leisure and hospitality. The economy shrunk after lay-offs involving the end of the space shuttle program in 2011, since many employees live in Titusville. Titusville has a high unemployment rate.

Personal income
In 2000, the median income for a household in the city was $35,607, and the median income for a family was $42,453. This had risen to $44,925 median per household in 2010; $24,374 per capita income. Males had a median income of $36,076 versus $23,998 for females. The per capita income for the city was $18,901.  About 9.3 percent of families and 12.4 percent of the population were below the poverty line, including 17.6 percent of those under age 18 and 6.8 percent of those age 65 or over.

In 2018, Titusville, FL had a median household income of $43,765. Between 2017 and 2018 its median household income grew from $42,561 to $43,765.

Industry
Many of Titusville's major employers are aerospace companies. Knight's Armament Company in Titusville is believed to be the state's largest manufacturer of small arms. Parrish Medical Center, located in Titusville, is the city's largest employer. In October 2013, Barn Light Electric Company opened a new manufacturing plant, providing work for at least 60 former NASA workers and men who had completed drug rehabilitation.

Tourism

The city has benefited from tourism associated with the space program, and the TICO Warbird Air Show each March draws about 40,000–50,000 visitors.

While  from the event, the city gets a noticeable economic effect from bikers on their way to the annual Daytona Beach Bike Week.

Workforce
The unemployment rate was 3.6% in 2000 and 2005. In 2007, the average size of Titusville's labor force was 20,716. Of that group, 19,879 were employed and 837 were unemployed, for an unemployment rate of 4 percent. In December 2010, the city had the highest unemployment in the county, 13.8 percent.

Housing
In 2008, 55 building permits for 64 units were issued. This was down from 195 permits for 657 units in 2007. The city issued 292 permits for 360 units in 2006.

In 2001 149 permits were issued for $18.6 million worth of property; 453 in 2005 for $65.7 million; 45 in 2010 for $9.5 million.

The median home price in 2007 was $158,900.

Retail
Shopping centers include Walmart Supercenter and Target. They are located in the city's shopping district at the southern end of the city, near the intersection of State Road 405 (Florida) and State Road 50 (Florida).

Library
The Titusville Public Library is one of seventeen branches within the Brevard County Library System, and it was one of the first of five public libraries in Brevard County, Florida. The birth of the Titusville library began in 1900 due to the efforts of the Progressive Culture Club. The goal of the club was to "promote social intercourse, and to encourage and develop good literary taste." Working with the newly formed Titusville Library Association, the club was able to acquire enough funds to open an official library in 1922 at the corner of Washington and Palmetto Streets. The library was located on the second floor, while the first floor was used for club space. The Progressive Culture Club and the Titusville Library Association later merged to form the Women's Club. In 1949, the library moved in to the Women's Club on Hopkins Avenue. The club continued to operate it until 1954 when it officially became the library for North Brevard. Eventually, this building became inadequate, and the library was briefly relocated to an abandoned canning plant. This location made the library more accessible to the public.

Titusville Public Library/Mildred Bruner Memorial Library 
In 1957, the Women's Club helmed a project to open a new Titusville Public Library. Designed by Frans Larson, the new library opened at Draa Road and Park Avenue in 1962. The library was renamed the Mildred Bruner Memorial Library in 1966 in honor of the longtime Titusville civic leader. The library closed in July 1972 after the North Brevard Public Library opened. The North Brevard Art League (formerly Titusville Art League) took over the building.

The Indian River City Public Library 
Another Titusville public library known as The Indian River City Public Library, was originally located in south Titusville in the lobby of a post office. Construction for a new Indian River City Library building began in September 1958 at the corner of Coquina and Magnolia and was opened by November of that year. The branch continued to operate until July 1972.

The North Brevard Public Library 
In July 1968, local residents were polled to see if there was enough support to open a large library facility that would replace the antiquated Indian River City Public Library and the Mildred Bruner Memorial Library. On November 4, 1969, residents voted for a one million tax referendum that helped finance the opening of a new public library. At one point, there were plans to open the library at the former Miracle City Shopping Center location. The developers of the center passed on the idea, and the plan was abandoned. After a series of delays, the North Brevard Public Library, opened at its South Hopkins location on July 31, 1972. The building was designed by architect Dick Lemon of Dick Lemon and Megginson Architectural firm. A total of 43,000 books were hauled to the new library from the Indian River County Library and Mildred Bruner Memorial Library. In 1979, the library expanded its space following a donation from the Jacob Hannamann family. Three rooms are named in the family's honor.

Prior to COVID-19, the library provided a variety programs, including Master Gardeners, Line Dancing, volunteer-operated food drives, and Coloring Club for adults. Youth programs included Storytime, Crafts, and Teen Game Night. Other lessons included basic cooking, chess, upcycling and sustainability topics, and yoga. The library also provides eBooks, audiobooks, music, and other digital media via Hoopla and OverDrive.

The library also houses the Nancy Sieck Memorial Genealogy Area. Although it's not the largest of Brevard County's Genealogical Collections, it holds over 2200 genealogy books, over l00 periodicals, as well as microfiche and film with over 2200 books, over 100 periodicals, microfiche and film. Volunteers are in the library on Thursdays to help with research. The Library also has a microfilm machine to aid in research.

In 2015, a former patron left the Titusville Public Library a donation of about $860,000. This has been the largest donation made to the Brevard County Library System to date. Renovations started in 2017 and were completed in 2018.

In 2012, the Titusville branch and other Brevard County Public Libraries faced scrutiny after pulling 50 Shades of Grey from their shelves citing that it did not meet their selection criteria and for its erotic content. This decision was quickly rescinded after public outcries of censorship 

The Titusville Public Library and other Brevard County Libraries have a strong social media presence on Facebook, Twitter, and Instagram where they update their community on upcoming events, collaborations, collection alterations or acquisitions, and any shifts in the library industry.

Infrastructure

Roads 

  U.S. 1 – This is the main north–south road through Titusville, intersecting most major roads and running through downtown. Major intersections include SR 405 (cloverleaf interchange), SR 50, SR 405, and SR 406/CR 402.
  Interstate 95 – There are three exits in Titusville: Exit 212 (SR 407), Exit 215 (SR 50), and Exit 220 (SR 406/CR 406).
  SR 50 – SR 50, known locally as Cheney Highway, enters Titusville at Interstate 95 and terminates entirely at U.S. 1. Major intersections include Interstate 95, SR 405, and U.S. 1.
  CR 402 – This short county road links two separated portions of SR 406 from U.S 1 to the Merritt Island National Wildlife Refuge. Its local name is A. Max Brewer Memorial Parkway.
  CR 405 – With the designation almost completely unknown to the common, this hidden-designated county road runs on residential roads as a parallel to U.S. 1.
  SR 405 – This half-moon shaped road, known as Columbia Street south of SR 50 and South Street north of SR 50, is a somewhat minor state road making a sort of belt road around much of Titusville, running along the extreme west and south edges of the city. Major intersection include U.S. 1, SR 50, SR 407, and U.S. 1 (cloverleaf interchange).
  CR 406 – A minor county road connecting the end of SR 406 at Interstate 95 to Carpenter Road.
  SR 406 – One of the main east–west roads in Titusville, the first segment of SR 406 known as Garden Street connects Interstate 95 to U.S. 1 and downtown Titusville. The second segment, known as A. Max Brewer Memorial Parkway, connects CR 402 with Courtenay Parkway and onto Volusia County. The segments are bridged by CR 402. Major intersections include CR 406, Interstate 95, CR 405, U.S 1 and CR 402.
  SR 407 – This two-lane limited-access road connects SR 528, from the central part of the county, to Titusville. It is also the main route to get to Kennedy Space Center from Interstate 95 northbound. There are only four intersections, two grade-separated: FL 528, Interstate 95, Shepard Drive, and FL 405.

Utilities
The water department had 22,000 customers in 2010.

Airports
Space Coast Regional Airport (commercial aviation), located just south of the city
Arthur Dunn Airpark (general aviation)

Transportation
Titusville is served by SCAT's #1, #2, and #5 routes.

Historic sites and museums

 Judge George Robbins House

 North Brevard Historical Museum
Pritchard House
St. Gabriel's Episcopal Church
Spell House
Titusville Commercial District
American Police Hall of Fame & Museum
United States Astronaut Hall of Fame
 US Space Walk of Fame and Museum
 Valiant Air Command Warbird Museum
Wager House

Health care
Parrish Medical Center, originally established as North Brevard Hospital in 1958, is the hospital that serves Titusville. A new 371,000-sq.ft., $80 million hospital was completed in 2002. It was the first medical center in the Southeast region designed and constructed using the 7 Principles of Evidence-Based Design to create a healing environment. It was also among the first participants of The Pebble Project, a national research initiative to demonstrate that healing environments improve overall quality of care and create life-enhancing environments for patients, families and employees.

Education
It was estimated in 2007 that 88.1 percent of all Titusville residents 25 years or older are high school graduates, and 23.6 percent have a bachelor's degree or higher.

Primary and secondary public schools are run by the Brevard County School Board:

Elementary schools
Apollo Elementary School
Coquina Elementary School
Imperial Estates Elementary School
Oak Park Elementary School
South Lake Elementary School

Middle schools
Jackson Middle School
Madison Middle School

High schools
Titusville High School
Astronaut High School

Private schools
 Park Avenue Christian Academy
 Sculptor Charter School
 St. Teresa Catholic School
 Temple Christian School

Colleges
Eastern Florida State College

Media

Television
TitusvilleCityTV|Spectrum Channel 498, AT&T U-verse Channel 99

Radio
WIXC-AM 	
WNUE-FM
WPIO-FM

Notable people

 Scott Clendenin, former bassist for the progressive metal bands Death and Control Denied 
 Cris Collinsworth, former NFL football player; born in Dayton, Ohio and grew up in Titusville
 Bill DeMott professional wrestler/trainer is from Titusville
 "Hacksaw" Jim Duggan, professional wrestler; previously lived in Titusville, and for a time owned a gym on Cheney Hwy called "Hacksaw Duggan's Muscle and Fitness" which opened in 1995
 Jeff Fulchino, Major League baseball player, born in Titusville
 John Jurasek, YouTube personality, food critic and radio host
 Larry Laoretti, former Senior PGA Tour golfer
 Hiram Mann, U.S. Air Force Lt. Colonel and pilot, member of the Tuskegee Airmen 332nd Fighter Group during World War II
 Wilber Marshall, former NFL football player, College Football Hall of Fame; attended Astronaut High School
Latavius Murray, NFL Running Back, born in Titusville
 Kario Oquendo, college basketball player for the Georgia Bulldogs
 Mike Polchlopek, professional wrestler, born in Titusville
 Daniel Tosh, stand-up comedian (creator/host of Tosh.0); born in Boppard, Rhineland-Palatinate, West Germany and grew up in Titusville
 Aaron Walker, NFL football player
 Johnny Weissmuller, actor known for playing Tarzan; helped develop the now abandoned theme park Tropical Wonderland

References

External links

The Florida Star, former African-American Titusville newspaper online in the Florida Digital Newspaper Library
Synopsis of Col. Henry Titus at the Historical Society of North Brevard, Inc.
History of Titusville

 
Cities in Brevard County, Florida
County seats in Florida
Populated places established in 1867
Cities in Florida
Populated places on the Intracoastal Waterway in Florida
1867 establishments in Florida